IPU may refer to:

Organizations
 Inter-Parliamentary Union, the world organization of parliaments
 International Peasant Union, a political international of agrarian anti-communist parties
 Interplanetary Phenomenon Unit,  claimed by some ufologists to be a division of the US Government involved with UFOs
 Irish Postal Union, a trade union
 Irish Print Union, a trade union
 Independence Party (Finland),  (IPU)

Schools
 Indraprasta PGRI University, Indonesia
 International Pacific University, Japan
 International Psychoanalytic University Berlin, Germany
 Ishikawa Prefectural University, Japan
 Iwate Prefectural University, Japan
 Guru Gobind Singh Indraprastha University, India, formerly Indraprastha University

Other uses
 Intelligence Processing Unit, a microprocessor specialised for processing machine learning workloads, pioneered by UK based semiconductor startup Graphcore
 Interconnect processing unit, a compound hardware/software component employed in multiprocessor system-on-chip
 International Pop Underground Convention, a music festival in Olympia, Washington, US
 Invisible Pink Unicorn, the goddess of a parody religion aimed at satirizing theistic beliefs
 Image Processing Unit, a processor for processing digital images
 Integrated Police Unit of the European Union missions.

See also

 Ipu, Ceará, a town in Brazil
 Ipu, a percussion instrument made from gourds
 Ipu (nurse), a royal nurse during the 18th Dynasty of ancient Egypt
 Akhmim, a city in Egypt, ancient name Ipu